Monte Beigua (also in Ligurian: Monte Peigoa) is a mountain in the Ligurian Apennines in Liguria, northern Italy, between the two communes of Varazze and Sassello.

Geography 
The mountain, at 1,287 m, is the highest peak in the so-called Gruppo del Beigua including Monte Grosso (1,265 m), Monte Ermetta (1,267 m) and Bric Veciri (1,263). The upper part of the mount houses transmission antennas used by RAI (Italian state television) and other private networks.

History 
It has been hypothized that it was a sacred mountain to the Liguri tribe living here in pre-Roman times, together with the Mont Bégo and Monte Sagro. It has been identified as a Neolithic source of jadeite.

Nature conservation 
It is included in the eponymous Regional Park.

References

External links
 Monte Beigua peak webcam

Global Geoparks Network members
Beigua
Geoparks in Italy
Beigua
Natura 2000 in Italy
Beigua